In computing, recover is a primitive file system error recovery utility included in MS-DOS / IBM PC DOS versions prior to DOS 6.0 and a number of other operating systems.

Overview

The program removed all subdirectories and all entries in the root directory, and then created new files with names such as "" in the root directory, corresponding to the valid allocation chains that were found in the FAT area (excluding disk clusters that were tested and found to have hardware errors).  A formerly bootable disk would no longer be bootable after recover had executed.  The range of circumstances in which recover was genuinely useful was quite limited, and well-meaning DOS users sometimes created havoc by running recover under the misconception that it was a file undelete utility.

In DOS version 5, another mode of operation was added: specifying a single filename on the command line would cause the program to test all the disk sectors used to store the file, and shorten the file by omitting sectors which tested bad.

DR DOS 6.0 includes an implementation of the  command. The command is also available on SISNE plus and IBM OS/2. The FreeDOS version was developed by Imre Leber and is licensed under the GPL.

See also
 Chkdsk
 Scandisk
 Norton Utilities
 List of DOS commands

References

Further reading

External links

recover | Microsoft Docs
Open source RECOVER implementation that comes with MS-DOS v2.0

Disk file systems
External DOS commands
IBM PC compatibles
Microsoft free software
OS/2 commands